Ochrana warszawska i jej tajemnice is a Polish historical film. It was released in 1916.

References

External links
 

1916 films
Polish historical films
Polish silent films
Polish black-and-white films
1910s historical films